Sacrococcygeal can refer to:
 Sacrococcygeal teratoma
 Anterior sacrococcygeal ligament
 Posterior sacrococcygeal ligament
 Sacrococcygeal symphysis
 Sacrococcygeal membrane